Severnaya Zemlya ( (Northern Land)) is a  archipelago in the Russian high Arctic. It lies off Siberia's Taymyr Peninsula, separated from the mainland by the Vilkitsky Strait. This archipelago separates two marginal seas of the Arctic Ocean, the Kara Sea in the west and the Laptev Sea in the east.

Severnaya Zemlya was first noted in 1913 and first charted in 1930–32, making it the last sizeable archipelago on Earth to be explored. Administratively, the islands form part of Russia's Krasnoyarsk Krai. In Soviet times there were a number of research stations in different locations, but currently there are no human inhabitants in Severnaya Zemlya, except for the Prima Polar Station near Cape Baranov.

The largest glacier in the Russian Federation, the Academy of Sciences Glacier, is located in Severnaya Zemlya. The archipelago is notable as well in connection with the ongoing multiyear Arctic sea ice decline. Until recently, ice joined the islands to Eurasia, even at its smallest extent during the late summer melt season, blocking the Northeast Passage between the Atlantic and the Pacific. By the late summer of 2012, however, the permanent ice had reached a record low extent and open water appeared to the south of the archipelago.

History
Although Severnaya Zemlya lies not far off the northern coast of Siberia, cartographers did not formally record it until the 20th century. Earlier explorers deemed that there was a land mass in the general area - note for example the report by Matvei Gedenschtrom and Yakov Sannikov made in 1810 at the time of their exploration of the New Siberian Islands.

Later in the 19th century, Adolf Erik Nordenskiöld during the Vega expedition sailed very close to this land in 1878 but did not notice it. In 1882, the Danish Arctic explorer and naval officer Andreas Peter Hovgaard, leader of the Arctic survey Dijmphna expedition, set himself the goal of discovering land north of Cape Chelyuskin and exploring the unknown northeastern limits of the Kara Sea. However, Hovgaard was prevented from accomplishing his objectives after having become trapped in thick ice, and his expedition was unable to reach even the shores of the Taymyr Peninsula.

Even at the end of the 19th century, both Nansen's Fram expedition of 1895 and Eduard Toll's Russian polar expedition of 1900–02 on the ship Zarya failed to note any traces of land to the north of the  strait between the Kara Sea and the Laptev Sea that they navigated.

Emperor Nicholas II Land

The archipelago first appeared on the map with the 1913–1915 Arctic Ocean Hydrographic Expedition of the icebreakers Taimyr and Vaigach. The chief organiser and first captain of the Vaygach was officer Aleksandr Vasiliyevich Kolchak of the Imperial Russian Navy. The expedition, privately financed, was launched in 1910 and led by Boris Vilkitsky on behalf of the Russian Hydrographic Service. This venture accomplished its goal of exploring the uncharted areas of the continental side of the Northern Sea Route in what was seen as the culmination of the Great Northern Expedition, an ambitious enterprise initially conceived by emperor Peter I the Great in order to map the whole of the northern coast of Russia to the east.

On 3 September 1913 (22 August 1913 in the Julian calendar used by Russia at the time), members of Vilkitsky's expedition landed on what is now known as Cape Berg on present-day October Revolution Island. They raised the Russian flag on the shore and named the new territory Tayvay Land (Zemlya Tayvay), after the first syllable of each of their icebreakers' names. During the days that followed, Vilkitsky's expedition charted parts of the Laptev Sea coast of what they believed to be a single island. Barely six months later, in early 1914, by order of the Secretary of the Imperial Navy, the new discovery was renamed Emperor Nicholas II Land (Zemlya Imperatora Nikolaya II), after the ruling Emperor Nicholas II of Russia.

Later exploration and present era
In 1926, the Presidium of the Central Executive Committee of the USSR renamed the still not fully-explored land Severnaya Zemlya. In May 1928, Umberto Nobile and his crew in the Airship Italia attempted to overfly the islands, but adverse weather conditions forced them to turn southward when only an hour or two from viewing the archipelago's coastline.

In the spring of 1931, Georgy Ushakov, accompanied by the geologist Nikolay Urvantsev, the veteran surveyor Sergei Zhuravlev, and the radio-operator Vasily Khodov, thoroughly surveyed Severnaya Zemlya during a two-year expedition to the archipelago. Ushakov and his team established a small base at Golomyanny – the western end of Sredniy Island, off October Revolution Island's western coast. From there they made multiple surveying-trips into the interior and to the coastlines of the larger islands. The first detailed map drawn by the expedition's cartographers showed Severnaya Zemlya divided into four main islands. Geographic features of the territory were named after communist organisations, events, and personalities. With reference to Severnaya Zemlya Ushakov wrote:

The Graf Zeppelin flew over the area during its polar flight of July 1931 and recorded some cartographic and meteorological data; Hugo Eckener tried to take pictures of the yet unsurveyed western coast, but it was obscured by fog and clouds.

Although German communists had endured suffering under the Third Reich, due to anti-German sentiment caused by the 1941–1945 German-Soviet War in the USSR some features of Severnaya Zemlya that had been previously named in solidarity with German Communism were given Russian or neutral-sounding names, e.g. Cape Unslicht becoming Mys Peschanyy and Proliv Yungshturm becoming Yuny Strait.

During the period of the Cold War (1940s to 1980s), the islands of Severnaya Zemlya continued to be studied by a team of geologists from NIIGA (the Scientific Research Institute of Arctic Geology) in St. Petersburg, (then known as Leningrad). Between 1948 and 1954 a comprehensive geological map was compiled under B. Kh. Egiazarov. Also more accurate maps were drawn by means of cartographic data gathered from aerial-photography surveys.

Administratively, Severnaya Zemlya formed part of the Taymyr Autonomous Okrug until this okrug was merged into Krasnoyarsk Krai on 1 January 2007.  it belongs to the Taymyrsky Dolgano-Nenetsky District of Krasnoyarsk Krai. There has been a request at the Krasnoyarsk Krai Legislative Assembly to reinstate the former name of Severnaya Zemlya as "Emperor Nicholas II Land". This request, however, has been rejected by the local government for the time being.

Geography

It is separated from the Taymyr Peninsula by the Vilkitsky Strait. Komsomolets is separated from Canada's northernmost point, Cape Columbia, by under 2000km.

Four of the main islands are largely glaciated, October Revolution, Komsomolets, and Pioneer, as well as the smaller Schmidt Island at the northwestern limit. The glacierised area on Bolshevik, the southernmost main island of the group, covers about a quarter of its land's surface. The southmost point of Severnaya Zemlya is Cape Neupokoyev at the SW end of Bolshevik Island. The highest point of the archipelago is  Mount Karpinsky, the summit of the Karpinsky Glacier, an ice dome on October Revolution Island. The Red Army Strait separates Komsomolets Island from October Revolution Island and the broader Shokalsky Strait Bolshevik Island from October Revolution Island. Both straits connect the Kara Sea in the west with the Laptev Sea in the east.

The large rivers Ob and Yenisei, among others, flow from the south into this marginal sea area of the Arctic Ocean, with their abundant waters contributing to a climate with relatively high precipitation despite the prevalent extreme cold temperatures of the high latitude. The Laptev Sea, where the mighty Lena River steadily expands its large delta, lies to the east of Severnaya Zemlya. The topographic relief of the archipelago is quite smooth, with Neoproterozoic and Palaeozoic sedimentary successions dominating its bedrock geology.

Glaciers

Glaciers in the archipelago have a characteristic dome shape with a continuously decreasing surface towards their edges. Ice cliffs are found only at the base. The places where the glaciers reach the sea contribute to the formation of icebergs. The most active glacier fronts are the eastern side of the Academy of Sciences Glacier at Krenkel Bay as well as its southern side. Another quite active glacier is the Rusanov Glacier on the island of October Revolution with its terminus at Matusevich Fjord.

October Revolution, with seven glaciers, is the island with most individual glaciers in Severnaya Zemlya. Next are the islands of Bolshevik with six, Komsomolets with four, Pioneer with two and Schmidt Island with one.

Main islands

October Revolution

October Revolution Island (Ostrov Oktyabrskoy Revolyutsii) is the largest island of the Severnaya Zemlya group in the Russian Arctic.

The area of this island has been estimated at  making it the 59th largest island in the world. Half the island is covered with glaciers reaching down into the sea. In the sections free from ice, the vegetation is desert or tundra. The island was first explored and named by the expedition of G.A. Ushakov and Nikolay N. Urvantsev in 1930–32.

October Revolution Island houses five domed ice caps; clockwise from north, they are named: Rusanov, Karpinsky, University, Vavilov and Albanov. The Vavilov Meteorological Station was operated from 1974 to 1988 on the northern part of the Vavilov Ice Cap. Other minor ice caps on the island include the Mal'yutka Glacier. The Podemnaya River and the Bolshaya River drain to the northwest between the Vavilov and Albanov glaciers, and the Bedovaya and Obryvistaya Rivers drain to the north between Albanov and Rusanov. The largest lake of the island and the entire archipelago, Fiordovoye, is located on the southwestern edge of the Karpinsky glacier. To the east and south of the island are the large Matusevich Fjord and the smaller Marat Fjord. They, together with the lake, encircle the Karpinsky ice cap. Cape October is located in the northern part of the island facing the Red Army Strait.

Ostrov Vysokiy is an islet located in a small bay on October Revolution Island's southwest shores.

Bolshevik

Bolshevik Island is the southernmost and second largest island in the group, located across the Shokalsky Strait from October Revolution Island.

It houses an Arctic base named Prima near Cape Baranov.

Parts of the shore of the island are deeply indented, with Mikoyan Bay in the north and Solnechny Bay in the south, as well as fjords such as the large Akhmatov Fjord, and the smaller Thaelmann Fjord, Spartak Fjord and Partizan Fjord.

Bolshevik Island is comparatively less glaciated than the other islands of Severnaya Zemlya. Only about 30% of the island is covered by glaciers while the coastal plains have a sparse vegetation of moss and lichen. The Leningrad Glacier, Semyonov-Tyan-Shansky Glacier, Kropotkin Glacier, Mushketov Glacier and Aerosyomki Glacier are located in the interior of the island and do not reach the sea.

Ostrov Tash is a small island located on Bolshevik's southern shore. Lavrov Island is located off the NE shore and Ostrov Lishniy off its northern tip.

Komsomolets

Komsomolets Island is the northernmost island of the Severnaya Zemlya group in the Russian Arctic, and the third largest island in the group. It is the 82nd largest island on earth.

The northernmost point of the island is called the Arctic Cape. This is the launching point for many Arctic expeditions.

Some 65% of the island is covered with glaciers. Komsomolets Island is home to the largest ice cap in Russia, the Academy of Sciences Ice Cap, which covers most of the island between Krenkel Bay in the east and Zhuravlev Bay in the west.

The soil of the island is mostly composed of loose loam and sand, a tundra desert scattered with mosses and lichens. The island was first explored and named by the expedition of Georgy Ushakov and Nikolay Urvantsev in 1930–32. In keeping with their scheme of naming the islands after events and movements of the Russian Revolution, this island was named in honour of the members of the Komsomol, the "Communist Union of Youth".

Off the northwestern shores of Komsomolets Island lies a group of islets known as Ostrova Dem'yana Bednogo.

Pioneer Island

Pioneer Island, Ostrov Pioner in Russian. It is the westernmost of the large islands of the Severnaya Zemlya group and is separated from Komsomolets Island by the Yuny Strait. Pioneer island measures  in area.

This island houses the Pioneer Glacier. Thelodonti fossils from the Upper Silurian have been found in the island.

Off Pioneer Island's southwestern end lies Krupskoy Island. The sound that separates it from Pioneer is only  in width.

This island should not be confused with Pioneer Island in Canada.

Schmidt Island

This island is quite detached from the whole Severnaya Zemlya group. It is also its northernmost island and before modern climate warming it was fully in the region of permanent sea ice.

This island is almost entirely covered by the Schmidt Ice Cap. Owing to its exposed position, the climate in the Schmidt Island's area is much colder than in the rest of the archipelago.

Schmidt Island was named after the Soviet scientist Otto Schmidt.

Minor islands and island groups
Close to the main archipelago of Severnaya Zemlya there are a number of smaller islands and archipelagos. There are also many small coastal islands and islets in different locations, such as Krupskoy to the west of Pioneer and Naydenysh near Cape Anuchin in October Revolution Island. Among the other minor islands the following deserve mention:

Sedov Archipelago

The Sedov Archipelago, formerly known as Sergey Kamenev Islands, is located just west of October Revolution Island on the Kara Sea side. The main islands of this archipelago are Sredny (the longest island), Domashnyy, Strela, and Figurnyy. Close to the shore of October Revolution Island lies Obmannyy Island and  further offshore southwards lies Dlinnyy Island. These other coastal islands are sometimes included as part of the Sedov Group.

An official request has been forwarded to rename Domashnyy Island as Svyatoy Anastasii, St. Anastasia Island.

Krasnoflotskiye Islands

Located just south of October Revolution Island in the Kara Sea. The Krasnoflotskiye Islands extend from north to south in an almost straight line . The main islands are Sverdlova – very close to Cape Sverdlov on the coast, Bolshoy – not much larger than the others despite its name, Sredniy and Greben far offshore. All islands are devoid of vegetation.

 to the SW of Greben Island lie two small islets named Opasnye, which are also part of this group.

The Krasnoflotskiye Islands were first sighted and mapped in August 1932 by the expedition of the All-Union Arctic Institute on icebreaker Rusanov. There is an Arctic Station in the Krasnoflotskiye Islands (AS-042), which has been operating since 1953.

Maly Taymyr and Starokadomsky

This is a small group including two main islands located in the Laptev Sea, off the far southeastern end of Bolshevik Island.

Maly Taymyr was discovered by Boris Vilkitsky during the Arctic Ocean Hydrographic Expedition in 1913 and was named "Tsarevich Alexei Island", after the son of Zar Nicholas II of Russia. Following the 1917 October Revolution the island was renamed "Maly Taymyr". In 2005 an official request was forwarded to the local government in Krasnoyarsk Krai in order to reinstate its former name to the island as Alexei Island.

Starokadomsky Island is close by to Maly Taymyr, located off its northwestern side and separated from it by a narrow  sound. This island was named after Dr. Leonid Starokadomsky, one of the leaders of the 1913 Arctic Ocean Hydrographic Expedition.

Lishniy Island

Almost all the island is rocky, except for the northwestern part. The highest point of Lishniy Island is 

South of Lishniy lies Yuzhnyy, a smaller island, and two islets. Lishniy off Severnaya Zemlya should not be confused with Lishny Island off Toll Bay, south of the Firnley Islands.

Climate
The archipelago sees large temperature fluctuations during winter months, as low-pressure cyclonic activity originating in the North Atlantic make their way across the Arctic, bringing precipitation and higher temperatures. These cyclones are most common in September and October, which see 30% of annual precipitation.

Flora and fauna

Rare vascular plants include species of Cerastium and Saxifraga. Non-vascular plants include the moss genera Detrichum, Dicranum, Pogonatum, Sanionia, Bryum, Orthothecium and Tortula, as well as the lichen genera Cetraria, Thamnolia, Cornicularia, Lecidea, Ochrolechia and Parmelia. Common flowering plants of the high Arctic such as the purple saxifrage (Saxifraga oppositifolia) and the Arctic poppy (Papaver radicatum) also occur on Severnaya Zemlya.

According to a survey of prior observations by De Korte, Volkov, and Gavrilo, thirty-two bird species have been observed on Severnaya Zemlya, 17 of which are known to breed on the islands. Eight species are widespread across the archipelago: five of which are colonial seabirds: little auk (Alle alle), black-legged kittiwake (Rissa tridactyla), black guillemot (Cepphus grylle), ivory gull (Pagophila eburnea), and glaucous gull (Larus hyperboreus); and three species of tundra bird: the snow bunting (Plectrophenax nivalis), purple sandpiper (Calidris maritima), and brent goose (Branta bernicla).

The most common mammal on Severnaya Zemlya is the collared lemming (Dicrostonyx torquatus), also known as Arctic lemming, which is present on all of the large islands and, in some places has been recorded to reach a density of 500 per km2 (1,300 per sq mi). The Arctic fox (Alopex lagopus) has been known to den on the islands, with several hundred observed in the 1980s. Other mammals occasionally observed include the wolf (Canis lupus), the polar bear (Ursus maritimus), ermine (Mustela erminea), walrus (Odobenus rosmarus), Arctic hare (Lepus timidus), and reindeer (Rangifer tarandus).

In culture

The discovery of Severnaya Zemlya is the subject of Veniamin Kaverin's novel The Two Captains as well as its stage adaptation, Nord-Ost.

The location of a secret Russian space weapons control facility is called Severnaya in the 1995 James Bond film GoldenEye. In several maps seen onscreen, however, this Severnaya is depicted as being in central Siberia. Severnaya is a level in GoldenEye 007, a 1997 video game based on the Bond film. 

Severnaya is the site of a Kaiju-controlled rogue Jaeger (giant mech) in the 2018 film Pacific Rim Uprising.

Severnaya is the site of the final act of the 2021 movie The Tomorrow War, where the protagonists locate a crashed spaceship holding the dormant White Spike Aliens.

See also

 List of islands of Russia
 List of fjords of Russia
 List of glaciers of Russia
 List of research stations in the Arctic

References

External links

 
 Arctic photos of Severnaya Zemlya by Ólafur Ingólfsson
 List of islands (Russian language)
 Glacial and Environmental History of Severnaya Zemlya, Siberian High Arctic, During the Last > 130,000 years

 
Archipelagoes of the Kara Sea
Archipelagoes of the Laptev Sea
Islands of Siberia
Archipelagoes of Krasnoyarsk Krai
Uninhabited islands of Russia